Eunuch (龍仇鳳血) is a TVB television series, premiered in 1980 starring wong yuen-sun and cecilia wong hang sau. Theme song "Eunuch" (龍仇鳳血) composition and arrangement by Joseph Koo, lyricist by Wong Jim, sung by Adam Cheng.

References

1980 Hong Kong television series debuts
1980 Hong Kong television series endings
TVB dramas
Cantonese-language television shows